Fabio Olivadisi (1586 – 10 November 1656) was a Roman Catholic prelate who served as Bishop of Catanzaro (1646–1656),
Bishop of Bova (1627–1646),
and Bishop of Lavello (1626–1627).

Biography
Fabio Olivadisi was born in Catanzaro, Italy in 1586.
On 16 November 1626, he was appointed during the papacy of Pope Urban VIII as Bishop of Lavello.
On 30 November 1626, he was consecrated bishop by Marcello Lante della Rovere, Cardinal-Priest of Santi Quirico e Giulitta, with Fabrizio Caracciolo Piscizi, Bishop of Catanzaro, and Giovanni Battista Altieri, Bishop of Camerino, serving as co-consecrators. 
On 20 September 1627, he was appointed during the papacy of Pope Urban VIII as Bishop of Bova.
On 16 July 1646, he was appointed during the papacy of Pope Innocent X as Bishop of Catanzaro.
He served as Bishop of Catanzaro until his death on 10 November 1656.

Episcopal succession
While bishop, he was the principal co-consecrator of:
Michele Angelo Vincentini, Bishop of Gerace (1650); 
Ferdinando Apicello, Bishop of Ruvo (1650); 
Lodovico Centofiorini, Bishop of Nicotera (1650); and
Giovanni Francesco Ferrari, Bishop of Isola (1650).

References

External links and additional sources
 (Chronology of Bishops) 
 (Chronology of Bishops) 
 (for Chronology of Bishops) 
 (for Chronology of Bishops) 
 (for Chronology of Bishops) 
 (for Chronology of Bishops) 

17th-century Italian Roman Catholic bishops
Bishops appointed by Pope Urban VIII
Bishops appointed by Pope Innocent X
1586 births
1656 deaths